Braybrooke is a surname. Notable people with the surname include:

David Braybrooke (1924–2013), American political philosopher
Garnet Braybrook, Australian rugby league footballer
Geoff Braybrooke (1935–2013), New Zealand politician
Gerard Braybrooke I (c. 1332 – 1403), English politician
Henry Braybrooke (1869–1935), English colonial administrator and cricketer
Patrick Braybrooke (1894–1956), English literary critic
Reynold Braybrooke (c. 1356 – 1405), English politician
Robert Braybrooke (died 1404), Dean of Salisbury and Bishop of London
Stephen Braybrooke (1808–1886), English cricketer

See also
Baron Braybrooke